Acanthocobitis (Paracanthocobitis) botia also known as the mottled zipper loach is a species of ray-finned fish in the genus, or subgenus, Paracanthocobitis. This species is known from the mainstem, and possibly tributaries of the Brahmaputra River, in Assam, India.

References

botia
Fish described in 1822